Ali Hassan Kuban (1929, Gorta, Egypt – 2001) was a Nubian singer and bandleader. He was known as the "Captain" or (later) "Godfather" of Nubian music.

Ali Hassan Kuban was born in Gorta, Egypt, a Nubian village near Aswan. After his family moved to Cairo, he learned to play the clarinet, and in 1949 he performed with the Opera of Cairo. He also played girba (bagpipes) with his own band during wedding celebrations. During the 1950s, Ali began adding Western instruments such as the saxophone, electric guitar, bass guitar, organ, trumpet and accordion to his ensemble. By the 1990s, he was performing for international audiences at events such as Midem (1993), WOMAD (1994), the Montreal Jazz Festival (1994), and Central Park SummerStage (1995).

Discography 
Albums
 From Nubia to Cairo (1980), Shanachie – reissued 2001, Piranha
 Walk Like a Nubian (1991), Piranha
 Nubian Magic (1995), Mercator – reissued 1999, Blue Flame
 Real Nubian: Cairo Wedding Classics (2001), Piranha
 The Rough Guide to Ali Hassan Kuban (2002), World Music Network – compilation

Contributing artist
 The Rough Guide to World Music (1994), World Music Network
 The Rough Guide to the Music of North Africa (1997), World Music Network

References

External links 
 

20th-century Egyptian male singers
Egyptian people of Nubian descent
1929 births
2001 deaths
Nubian people